Metacarcinus edwardsii, sometimes known as mola rock crab,  southern rock crab, or Chilean rock crab, is a species of crab from the Pacific coast of South America.

Distribution
Metacarcinus edwardsii is found along the Pacific coast between Guayaquil in Ecuador and the Beagle Channel in the southernmost Chile.

Description
Females reach functional maturity at carapace width , that is, 50% of females are egg-bearing at this size. Males reach functional maturity at slightly larger sizes.

Metacarcinus edwardsii is univoltine, with the mating season from October to January.

Utilization
In Chile, it is the most important commercially exploited crab, caught exclusively in artisanal fisheries.

References

External links
 
 

Cancroidea
Crustaceans of the eastern Pacific Ocean
Taxa named by Thomas Bell (zoologist)
Crustaceans described in 1835